Joseph Isadore "Pat" Kilhullen (August 10, 1890 – October 25, 1922) was a catcher in Major League Baseball. He played for the Pittsburgh Pirates.

References

External links

1890 births
1922 deaths
Major League Baseball catchers
Pittsburgh Pirates players
Baseball players from Pennsylvania
Minor league baseball managers
Worcester Busters players
New Bedford Whalers (baseball) players
Fitchburg Burghers players
Manchester Textiles players
Portland Duffs players
Lowell Grays players
Oakland Oaks (baseball) players
Denver Bears players
Portland Beavers players
People from Lackawanna County, Pennsylvania